Masumi Hayashi may refer to:

 Masumi Hayashi (photographer) (1945–2006), Japanese-American photographer
 Masumi Hayashi (murderer), convicted of killing four people with poisoned curry